Arts Educational Schools, or ArtsEd, is an independent performing arts school based in Chiswick in the London Borough of Hounslow.

Overview
ArtsEd provides specialist vocational training at secondary, further and higher education level in musical theatre and acting for film and television. The school also offers part-time and holiday courses in the performing arts.

ArtsEd is one of twenty-one specialist performing arts schools approved to offer government-funded Dance and Drama Awards, a scheme established to subsidise the cost of professional dance and drama training for the most talented students at leading institutions. It is a member of the Federation of Drama Schools.

History

School

ArtsEd was founded in 1939. It was formed as a result of a merger between the Cone School of Dancing founded in 1919 by Grace Cone, and the Ripman School founded in 1922 by Olive Ripman. Both Cone and Ripman offered curricula combining a general academic education with training in the arts, in preparation for professional careers connected with the theatre. The two schools were amalgamated in 1939 to form the Cone-Ripman School, the predecessor of today's ArtsEd.

The school was first based at Stratford Place in London, but following the outbreak of World War II, relocated to Tring, Hertfordshire, sharing premises with Rothschild Bank at Tring Park.

In 1941, the school reopened at Stratford Place, while the second school continued to operate in Tring. In 1947, both schools were renamed the Arts Educational Schools. The London school was later based at Hyde Park Corner (144 Piccadilly), and later still at Golden Lane House in the Barbican. In 1986 the school purchased the former buildings of Chiswick Polytechnic.

In the 2000s the two schools became independent of each other, and the Tring school has been renamed Tring Park School for the Performing Arts. Today, Arts Educational Schools London is a co–educational Independent Day School and Sixth Form for pupils aged 11–18, and a professional conservatoire specialising in acting and musical theatre, as well as a range of part-time courses.

For many years, the president of the school was prima ballerina assoluta Dame Alicia Markova; Dame Beryl Grey became Director in the 1960s. Dame Alicia was succeeded in 2007 by Andrew Lloyd Webber.

Iain Reid was dean of the schools from 1999 until his retirement in December 2006. He was succeeded by John Baraldi, former chief executive of Riverside Studios, and former director of the East 15 Acting School; Baraldi left the school in 2009, and was succeeded by Jane Harrison. In 2017, Chris Hocking assumed the role of principal; he resigned in 2021 and was succeeded by Dr. Julie Spencer as interim principal.

In 2013 ArtsEd was awarded a grant by the Andrew Lloyd Webber Foundation to fund a refurbishment project. The money was spent on the main theatre, costume storage, the School of Film and Television and the school's access facilities.

Chiswick School of Art

The arts and crafts architect Maurice Bingham Adams designed the Chiswick School of Art as part of the Bedford Park Garden Suburb's community focus on the site on Bath Road in 1881. It was destroyed by a V-1 flying bomb in 1944. The school was meant to provide the estate with a feeling of community. It taught classes such as "Freehand drawing in all its branches, practical Geometry and perspective, pottery and tile painting, design for decorative purposes – as in Wall-papers, Furniture, Metalwork, Stained Glass". The school was depicted by Thomas Erat Harrison in an 1882 book Bedford Park, celebrating the then-fashionable garden suburb.

Academics

Day School and Sixth Form 
The Day School and Sixth Form cater to students aged 11 to 18. Students are required to study mainstream subjects, in preparation for the GCSE and A-Levels, alongside their performing arts pursuits. Besides the A-Levels pathway, Sixth Form students have an option to complete a BTEC Extended Diploma in a performing arts discipline.

In 2015 the school was rated "Outstanding" by Ofsted. In 2019 it ranked second in the borough for percentage of pupils passing five or more GCSEs at A*-C.

Tertiary 
The school had been accredited by Drama UK (organisation dissolved in 2016). It offers Quality Assurance Agency for Higher Education recognised qualifications validated by the City University London or Trinity College, London. A non-degree foundation course is offered for students who do not meet the academic requirements for admission into the bachelor's degree programmes.

Former pupils 

 Kai Alexander (The Stranger, Catastrophe)
 Julie Andrews (The Sound of Music, Mary Poppins)
 Simone Ashley (Sex Education, Bridgerton)

 Samantha Barks (Les Misérables on stage and screen)
 Darcey Bussell (Former Principal with the Royal Ballet, Strictly Come Dancing judge)

 Gary Carr (Death in Paradise, Downton Abbey, The Deuce, The Good Fight)
 Adam Cooper (Former Principal with the Royal Ballet and Matthew Bourne's New Adventures)
 Martin Clunes (Doc Martin, Men Behaving Badly)  

 Omari Douglas (It's a Sin)  

 Laura Haddock (Da Vinci's Demons, Luther)
 Nigel Harman (EastEnders, Shrek The Musical)
 Nigel Havers (Chariots of Fire, Coronation Street)

 Finn Jones (Game of Thrones, Marvel's Iron Fist)

 Bonnie Langford (Doctor Who, Spamalot, EastEnders)
 Margaret Lockwood (The Wicked Lady, The Lady Vanishes)

 Lashana Lynch (Still Star-Crossed, No Time to Die)

 Madeleine Mantock (Charmed, Into the Badlands)
 Megan McKenna (Ex on the Beach, The Only Way Is Essex)
 Tuppence Middleton (Dickensian, War and Peace)

 Mimi Slinger (Emmerdale)
 Hugo Speer (The Full Monty, The Musketeers) 
 Louis Spencer, Viscount Althorp
 Michaela Strachan (Springwatch, The Hit Man and Her)

 Oliver Tompsett (Wicked, We Will Rock You)
 Sally Anne Triplett (Mamma Mia!, Chicago)

 Will Young (Pop Idol Winner)
 Yungblud

See also

 List of schools in Hounslow

References

External links

Profile on the Independent Schools Council website

The Arts Educational Schools
1939 establishments in England
Arts organizations established in 1939
Buildings and structures in Chiswick
Chiswick
Dance schools in the United Kingdom
Drama schools in London
Educational institutions established in 1939
Private co-educational schools in London
Private schools in the London Borough of Hounslow
Member schools of the Independent Schools Association (UK)